Keith Taylor (born November 20, 1998) is an American football cornerback for the Carolina Panthers of the National Football League (NFL). He played college football at Washington.

Early life and high school
Taylor grew up in Long Beach, California and initially attended St. John Bosco High School before transferring to Servite High School after his sophomore year. He was named first-team All-Trinity League and second-team All-Orange County by the Orange County Register.

College career
Taylor appeared in 12 games as a true freshman, playing on special teams and as a reserve defensive back. He started two games as a sophomore. He started all 13 of Washington's games as a junior and finished the year with 59 tackles with two tackles for loss and five passes broken up. Taylor started all four of the Huskies games in the 2020 season, which was abbreviated due to Covid-19.

Professional career
Taylor was drafted by the Carolina Panthers in the fifth round, 166th overall, of the 2021 NFL Draft. He signed his four-year rookie contract on May 13, 2021.

References

External links
Washington Huskies bio

Living people
Players of American football from Long Beach, California
American football cornerbacks
Washington Huskies football players
African-American players of American football
Carolina Panthers players
1998 births
21st-century African-American sportspeople